Maarten De Veuster (born 22 February 1973) is a Belgian politician and a member of the New Flemish Alliance.

De Veuster studied a business degree at the Karel de Grote University of Applied Sciences and Arts in Antwerp where he was an active member of the Flemish nationalist and conservative Katholiek Vlaams Hoogstudentenverbond (KVHV) student group. Since 2016, he has been a municiple councilor in Schoten for the N-VA. In 2019, he was elected as a member of the Flemish Parliament.

References

1973 births
Living people
Members of the Flemish Parliament
New Flemish Alliance politicians
21st-century Belgian politicians